Sir George Hodges Knox,  (17 December 1885 – 11 July 1960) was an Australian politician, orchardist and military officer. The City of Knox is named after him.

Knox was born in the Melbourne suburb of Prahran on 17 December 1885 and educated at Scotch College, Melbourne. He was the son of William Knox, who had been a member of the Victorian Legislative Council between 1897 and 1901, and the member for Kooyong in the House of Representatives. 
 
Knox began his working life as an electrical engineer. He married Kathleen Purves MacPherson in 1909. Soon after, he moved to Beaconsfield, Victoria, to establish an orchard. He joined the Citizen Military Forces in 1909 and served during the First World War, commanding the 23rd Battalion. He divorced in 1919. In 1920 he moved to Ferntree Gully, Victoria. He married Ada Victoria Harris in 1921. He was elected to the Fern Tree Gully Shire Council in 1923.

Knox won the Victorian Legislative Assembly seat for Upper Yarra in 1927 for the Nationalist Party. He became Speaker of the Victorian Legislative Assembly in 1942 and remained there until 1947. Between 1945 and 1960 he held the seat of Scoresby.

Notes

|-

1885 births
1960 deaths
Military personnel from Victoria (Australia)
20th-century Australian politicians
Australian brigadiers
Australian Companions of the Order of St Michael and St George
Australian electrical engineers
Australian military personnel of World War I
Australian Army personnel of World War II
Australian orchardists
Liberal Party of Australia members of the Parliament of Victoria
Military personnel from Melbourne
Nationalist Party of Australia members of the Parliament of Victoria
People educated at Scotch College, Melbourne
Politicians from Melbourne
Speakers of the Victorian Legislative Assembly
United Australia Party members of the Parliament of Victoria
People from Prahran, Victoria